Terence Pitt (30 November 1903 – 1957) was an Indian sprinter. He competed in the men's 100 metres, 200 metres and the 400 metres events at the 1924 Summer Olympics.

References

External links
 

1903 births
1957 deaths
Indian male sprinters
Athletes (track and field) at the 1924 Summer Olympics
Olympic athletes of India
Athletes from Kolkata
Anglo-Indian people
Indian emigrants to England
British people of Anglo-Indian descent